Brianna Iris Davey (born 13 January 1995) is an Australian footballer in both the Association football (soccer) and Australian rules football codes. In soccer, she was a goalkeeper for the national women's team the Matildas and played in the W-League for Melbourne Victory and Melbourne City. In 2016, she transitioned from soccer to Australian rules football, and was one of two initial marquee recruits for the Carlton Football Club in the AFL Women's (AFLW). She won the inaugural Carlton best and fairest award and was named in the 2017 AFL Women's All-Australian team. Davey served as Carlton captain from 2018 to 2019 before being traded to the Collingwood Football Club. She was appointed Collingwood co-captain alongside Steph Chiocci in 2021, and won the league best and fairest award for the 2021 season.

Association football career

Club
Davey was initially an Australian rules football player until discovered kicking a ball at age 13 by a soccer scout while on a family holiday. Instantly discovered to have a talent as goalkeeper, Davey made inroads early and made Victorian representative and elite squads. Signed to Melbourne Victory Women as a fifteen-year-old as back-up keeper to Matildas captain Melissa Barbieri in Season 2010–11, she made three appearances in the short 11 match season. Having done enough to prove to head coach Vicki Linton that she was already as talented as the ageing Barbieri, Linton cut Barbieri and installed Davey as the number one choice. She went on to be the standout keeper for the first half of Season 2011–12 of the W-League.

In August 2013, Davey agreed to play for Swedish Damallsvenskan club Linköping FC during the Australian off-season. Linköping coach Martin Sjögren required a replacement for Sofia Lundgren, who had a back injury. On signing Davey Sjögren described her as "probably the world's most talented goalkeeper".

On 20 August 2015, after five years with Victory, Davey signed a contract with intra-city rivals Melbourne City, becoming the first ever goalkeeper for their newly created W-League side.

International
Davey has represented Australia in the Young Matildas, often facing-off for the starting position with Brisbane Roar prodigy Casey Dumont.

After being involved in national team camps for over a year, Davey made her international debut for the Matildas in a 4–0 friendly victory over Haiti; keeping a clean sheet.

After a four-month residency programme, national coach Alen Stajcic surprisingly dropped Davey from Australia's 2015 FIFA Women's World Cup squad. Resurgent veteran Melissa Hudson (née Barbieri) was recalled at Davey's expense.

Australian rules football career
After missing the World Cup squad, Davey began playing with the St Kilda Sharks in the Victorian Women's Football League in the 2015 winter. Despite not having played Australian rules football since her early junior days, she was quickly recognised as one of the top midfielders in the competition, also capable of playing as a key defender.

AFL Women's
After having played both codes in parallel for two years (soccer in summer and Australian rules football in winter), Davey committed to Australian rules football, signing as a marquee player for Carlton in the inaugural AFL Women's competition. In January 2017, she was announced as the co-vice-captain of Carlton, alongside Madeline Keryk. She made her debut in round 1, 2017, in the club and the league's inaugural match at IKON Park against . At the end of the season, Davey received her team's nominations for both the AFLW Players’ Most Courageous Award and the AFLW Players’ Most Valuable Player Award, and was also listed in the 2017 All-Australian team. She was awarded the club's inaugural best and fairest award in a ceremony in April 2017.

Carlton signed Davey for the 2018 season during the trade period in May 2017. She was appointed the team's captain for the 2018 season, taking over for inaugural captain Lauren Arnell. In round 2 she suffered a serious knee injury that was later confirmed to be a season-ending ruptured anterior cruciate ligament.

Davey returned to Carlton in 2019 and captained them side to a Grand Final appearance against Adelaide, which was subsequently lost.

In April 2019, Davey was traded to Collingwood.

In March 2020, Davey was selected for a 2017–19 retrospective 22under22 squad. In December, it was announced that Davey would co-captain Collingwood alongside inaugural captain Steph Chiocci in 2021. She won the 2021 AFLPA MVP award, beating Fremantle's Kiara Bowers by six votes. She led the league for most handballs per game and was in the top ten for disposals and inside 50s. Davey was also selected as Collingwood's best and fairest for the 2021 season, as well as the AFL Women's best and fairest. Davey was awarded with her second All-Australian blazer, named in the ruck rover position as the captain of the team. It was revealed Davey had signed on with Collingwood for two years on 10 June 2021. Davey achieved selection in Champion Data's 2021 AFLW All-Star stats team.

AFLW Statistics
 Statistics are correct to the end of the S7 (2022) season

|- 
! scope="row" style="text-align:center" | 2017
|
| 1 || 6 || 1 || 0 || 58 || 56 || 114 || 23 || 17 || 0.2 || 0.0 || 9.7 || 9.3 || 19.0 || 3.8 || 2.7 || 5
|-
! scope="row" style="text-align:center" | 2018
|
| 1 || 2 || 0 || 0 || 20 || 12 || 32 || 6 || 8 || 0.0 || 0.0 || 10.0 || 6.0 || 16.0 || 3.0 || 4.0 || 5
|- 
! scope="row" style="text-align:center" | 2019
|
| 1 || 9 || 2 || 1 || 81 || 66 || 147 || 31 || 37 || 0.2 || 0.1 || 9.0 || 7.3 || 16.3 || 3.4 || 4.1 || 6
|-
! scope="row" style="text-align:center" | 2020
|
| 3 || 6 || 0 || 0 || 56 || 67 || 123 || 15 || 32 || 0.0 || 0.0 || 9.3 || 11.2 || 20.5 || 2.5 || 5.3 || 2
|- 
! scope="row" style="text-align:center" | 2021
|
| 3 || 11 || 6 || 6 || 139 || bgcolor=FA8072 | 123§ || bgcolor=FFBBFF | 262‡ || 39 || 63 || 0.5 || 0.5 || 12.6 || 11.2 || 23.8 || 3.5 || 5.7 || bgcolor=98FB98 | 15±
|- 
! scope="row" style="text-align:center" | 2022
|
| 3 || 1 || 0 || 0 || 9 || 7 || 16 || 2 || 8 || 0.0 || 0.0 || 9.0 || 7.0 || 16.0 || 2.0 || 8.0 || 0
|- 
! scope="row" style="text-align:center" | S7 (2022)
|
| 3 || 0 || — || — || — || — || — || — || — || — || — || — || — || — || — || — || —
|- class="sortbottom"
! colspan=3| Career
! 35
! 9
! 7
! 363
! 331
! 694
! 116
! 165
! 0.3
! 0.2
! 10.4
! 9.5
! 19.8
! 3.3
! 4.7
! 33
|}

Personal life
Davey's partner is fellow AFLW player Tilly Lucas-Rodd.

See also
 Women's association football in Australia
 Women's Australian rules football in Australia

References

External links

 

1995 births
Australian women's soccer players
Living people
Melbourne Victory FC (A-League Women) players
Melbourne City FC (A-League Women) players
Linköpings FC players
A-League Women players
Expatriate women's footballers in Sweden
Australia women's international soccer players
Women's association football goalkeepers
Carlton Football Club (AFLW) players
Australian rules footballers from Victoria (Australia)
All-Australians (AFL Women's)
Footballers who switched code
Damallsvenskan players
Victorian Women's Football League players
Lesbian sportswomen
LGBT players of Australian rules football
Australian LGBT sportspeople
21st-century Australian LGBT people
Australian expatriate sportspeople in Sweden
Australian expatriate women's soccer players
Soccer players from Melbourne
Sportswomen from Victoria (Australia)